Luca Barzaghi (born 1 June 1968) is an Italian male retired marathon runner, which participated at the 1995 World Championships in Athletics.

Achievements

References

External links
 

1968 births
Italian male marathon runners
World Athletics Championships athletes for Italy
Living people